Catholic Committee may refer to:
Catholic Committee (Ireland)
Cisalpine Club in England and its associated Catholic Committee